Greenore is a village, townland and deep water port on Carlingford Lough in County Louth, Ireland.

History
A lighthouse was built on Greenore Point in 1830. 

Several decades later, the Dundalk and Greenore Railway Act of 1863 authorised the construction of the port and railway. The port was constructed  in 1867 to provide links to Heysham and Fleetwood.  The village was constructed to provide homes for the dock and railway workers of the Dundalk, Newry and Greenore Railway.

Economy
Greenore has the only privately owned port in Ireland. It has three berths and can handle vessels of up to 39,999 gross tons. In 1964, the then disused port was used to fit out the ships used for the pirate radio stations Radio Caroline and Radio Atlanta (later Radio Caroline South). The port was owned by Aodogan O'Rahilly (1904-2000) - father of Radio Caroline founder Ronan O'Rahilly from 1958 until 2000. In the 1970s there was regular freight shipping from the port to Bristol. In 2005 Greenore was Ireland's 10th largest port in terms of tonnage handled with 649,000 tonnes of goods handled.

Greenore is also a brand of whiskey produced by the nearby Cooley Distillery.

Transport

On 21 July 2018 a ferry service commenced operations from Greenore, Co. Louth to Greencastle, County Down. The Scenic Carlingford Ferry operates a year round service using its vessel, the Frazer Aisling Gabrielle.

From 1873 to 1951 there was a ferry service between Greenore and Holyhead. The London and North Western Railway constructed a substantial hotel and railway station to serve passengers using the ferry. The original railway line ran from Dundalk to Greenore and the first service was 1 May 1873 when the station opened. In 1876 the railway line was extended to Newry. In the 19th century there was a ferry from Greencastle to Greenore. The railway and the station closed on 1 January 1952 and was replaced by bus services to Dundalk and Newry.

Bus Éireann route 161 links Greenore to Dundalk, Carlingford, Omeath and Newry. There are four weekday journeys to Dundalk and four to Carlingford. On schooldays there is an additional morning journey to Newry. There is no service on Sundays.

Sport
In 1896 the Greenore Golf Club was founded. As of 2009 it is a 6,647 yard course, with a par of 71.

Notable residents
Jimmy Magee, sports commentator

See also
 List of towns and villages in Ireland

References

Port cities and towns in the Republic of Ireland
Towns and villages in County Louth
Townlands of County Louth
Populated places established in 1867